Jennifer Pace Phillips is a fictional character from the defunct United States soap opera Search for Tomorrow. She was played by actress Morgan Fairchild from 1973 to 1977, the first in a long line of similar roles for Fairchild.

Storylines
Jennifer was the beautiful but extremely neurotic daughter of businessman Walter Pace (Tom Klunis) who was eventually married to Stephanie Wilkins. Because both Jennifer and Stephanie were vampy and extremely ne'er-do-well, they got along wonderfully. Jennifer was involved with Bruce Carson (Joel Higgins), the ward of Joanne Gardner. She then married her first husband, Scott Phillips (Peter Simon), who had been separated from his first wife Kathy Parker Phillips (Courtney Sherman). She drove her alcoholic husband back to drink, but was injured in an accident involving glass doors, leaving her unhinged.

Jennifer and her friend Hal Conrad had a hand in the death of Doug Martin, who had been discovered to be her former father in-law (Doug Martin was also Scott Phillips' father).

Her most despicable act was the murder of Doug's ex-wife, Eunice Gardner Wyatt (Ann Williams), Jo's sister. This was part of Jennifer's scheme to steal Eunice's husband, John Wyatt (Val Dufour). Jennifer felt that she had heard John's voice saying that she had to kill Eunice.

This act finally forced Walter to place his mentally unstable daughter into a sanitarium in 1977. The series did not provide further updates on Jennifer's life after her incarceration.

References

Pace, Jennifer
Television characters introduced in 1971